TVS Electronics is an Indian multinational electronics company, headquartered in Chennai. TVS Electronics designs, manufactures and distributes IT products, dot matrix printers, point of sale terminals, printer supplies, keyboards, mobiles, mouse, uninterruptible power supplies, and set top boxes. TVS Electronics was established in 1986 and is a part of the TVS Group. TVS Electronics also provides design, manufacturing and service support on a contractual basis for telephone and IT Companies.

References

External links

Manufacturing companies based in Chennai
Electronics companies of India
Indian companies established in 1986
TVS Group
1986 establishments in Tamil Nadu
Manufacturing companies established in 1986
Companies listed on the National Stock Exchange of India
Companies listed on the Bombay Stock Exchange
Indian brands